Ilsa, the Tigress of Siberia is a sexploitation "men in prison" style of film that was produced in Canada in 1977. It is the third sequel to Ilsa, She Wolf of the SS.

Plot
Dyanne Thorne repeats the title role, but this time Ilsa (referred to as "Comrade Colonel") supervises a 1953 Siberian gulag that mentally and physically destroys male political prisoners towards the fall of Stalinism.

Cast
 Dyanne Thorne as Ilsa
 Michel Morin as Andrei Chikurin
 Tony Angelo
 Terry Coady
 Howard Mauer 
 Michel Maillot
 Jean-Guy Latour as Gregory

References

External links
 

1977 films
Canadian sexploitation films
1970s English-language films
Films produced by Ivan Reitman
Films set in 1953
Films set in Siberia
Canadian pornographic films
English-language Canadian films
1970s erotic films
1970s pornographic films
1970s exploitation films
1970s Canadian films